Nau'Jour Lazier Grainger (born January 9, 2000), better known by his stage name Toosii, is an American rapper and singer. He is known for songs such as "Love Is...", "Red Lights", "Love Cycle", "Poetic Pain" and "Sapiosexual", and his debut studio album, Poetic Pain, which peaked at number 17 on the Billboard 200.

Biography 
Nau'Jour Grainger was born and grew up in Syracuse, New York, but later relocated to Raleigh, North Carolina at the age of 17. It was in Raleigh, North Carolina where he began to seriously pursue his musical career. Rap was an escape route from his issues as a youth. He started recording music at age 16, while playing high school football and figuring out his life path. His stage name came from his childhood nickname of "Toota", and changed it to Toosii after his football teammates said it as a joke, adding the two I's because "You need two eyes to see the vision". Toosii was discovered by the South Coast Music Group (home of fellow North Carolina rapper DaBaby). He signed with the record label in 2019.

Toosii was inspired to try music by both his brother and father and spent a period of time homeless before his career began to further develop. He got his big break in 2019 with the release of the track "Red Lights", which went on to accrue millions of streams. He then released his Who Dat mixtape on April 30, 2019, which was followed by the 13-track Platinum Heart mixtape on February 7, 2020. Platinum Heart reached number-one on the Billboard Heatseekers Album chart upon its initial release. The mixtape was later reissued as a 20-track deluxe version. On September 18, 2020, his third South Coast Music Group-affiliated Poetic Pain album was released as his first project on Capitol Records. His signing to Capitol was made on September 30, by Chris Turner (A&R) following the release of his official video for "Love Cycle" with Summer Walker. Toosii was credited with 50,000 US adjusted sales and over 250 million combined global streams in 2020 at the time of this release. "Love Cycle" was later certified as a US Gold single by the Recording Industry Association of America on January 11, 2021. His project Poetic Pain debuted at number 17 on the Billboard 200 chart in September 2020 and features the RIAA certification Gold single "Love Cycle" with Summer Walker.
On May 7, 2021, Toosii released his seventh mixtape, Thank You for Believing. The tape's title shows "gratitude to those that had faith in him and helped get him where he is today". It contains 13 tracks, and features Mulatto, Key Glock, and DaBaby. In 2021, he was featured on the XXL Freshman Class.

Discography

Studio albums

Mixtapes

Extended plays

Deluxe extended plays

Singles

Guest appearances

Notes

References 

2000 births
American rappers
American songwriters
Musicians from Syracuse, New York
Living people
Rappers from New York (state)
21st-century American male musicians
Musicians from Raleigh, North Carolina
Rappers from North Carolina